Benoît Robert Pouliot (born September 29, 1986) is a Canadian former professional ice hockey left winger who most recently played for the Buffalo Sabres of the National Hockey League (NHL). He has previously played in the NHL with the Minnesota Wild, Montreal Canadiens, Boston Bruins, Tampa Bay Lightning, New York Rangers and the Edmonton Oilers. Pouliot was originally drafted by the Wild fourth overall in the 2005 NHL Entry Draft.

Playing career

Amateur
Pouliot grew up in St. Isidore, Ontario, playing minor ice hockey for his hometown St. Isidore Eagles, where he was coached by his father Sylvain. Pouliot was later promoted to the AA Eastern Ontario Cobras of the ODMHA where he played up until the Bantam age level. He played in the 2000 Quebec International Pee-Wee Hockey Tournament with the Eastern Ontario team. He also saw time in Jr.B. with Les Castors de Clarence Creek.

Pouliot was later drafted in the 11th round, 207th overall, by the Ontario Hockey League (OHL)'s Sudbury Wolves in the 2002 OHL Priority Selection after playing for the Cobras. The following season, he was reassigned to the Hawkesbury Hawks Jr.A. club of the Canadian Junior Hockey League (CJHL), a team his father had previously played for.

In his first year, Pouliot won the Emms Family Award as the OHL's top rookie for 2004–05. On July 30, 2005, after his first full season of major junior hockey, he was drafted fourth overall by the Minnesota Wild at the 2005 NHL Entry Draft. Later that year, he was also named to the  Canadian junior team that ultimately won the gold medal at the 2006 World Junior Ice Hockey Championships. He finished the 2005–06 season with 65 points in 51 games, including 35 goals.

Professional
Pouliot signed a tryout contract with Minnesota's American Hockey League (AHL) affiliate, the Houston Aeros, on April 28, 2006, playing there for two games in the team's Semifinal Calder Cup playoff series against the Milwaukee Admirals. He was then signed professionally to the Wild on May 1. He made his NHL debut later in the year, on November 22, against the Montreal Canadiens, after which he would return to the Aeros until March 15, 2008.

Pouliot scored his first two career NHL goals for Minnesota against Calgary Flames on March 22, 2008, though the Wild still lost the game, 5–4.

Pouliot later was placed on the 2008–09 roster at the beginning season. After scoring just 11 points in 37 games, Pouliot was later sent down to the AHL's Aeros. On November 23, he was traded to the Montreal Canadiens in exchange for Guillaume Latendresse.

On July 1, 2011, Pouliot signed as a free agent with the Boston Bruins on a one-year, $1.1 million contract. On June 23, 2012, as a pending unrestricted free agent, Pouliot's rights were traded to the Tampa Bay Lightning in exchange for forward Michel Ouellet and a fifth- round draft pick (131st overall) used later that day at the 2012 NHL Entry Draft to select Seth Griffith. Two days later, Pouliot signed a one-year, $1.2 million contract extension with the Lightning.

On July 5, 2013, again as a free agent, Pouliot signed a one-year, $1.3 million contract with the New York Rangers.

After a successful season with the Rangers and looking for term after playing on three successive one-year deals, Pouliot agreed to a five-year, $20 million contract with the Edmonton Oilers on July 1, 2014. During his first season with the Oilers in the 2014–15 season, Pouliot transitioned easily to the rebuilding club, increasing his scoring presence with 34 points in just 58 games. He was sidelined for 24 games however due to injury.

Despite the Oilers returning to the playoffs after a 10-year hiatus in the 2016–17 season, Pouliot endured a lackluster year with 14 points in 67 games regular season games, and no points in 13 playoff games. On June 29, 2017, Pouliot was placed on waivers in order for the Oilers to buy-out the remaining two-years of his contract.

On July 1, 2017, Pouliot was promptly signed by the Buffalo Sabres as a free agent, to a one-year $1.15 million deal.

Personal
Pouliot's younger brother, Hugo, played for the same Hawkesbury Hawks Jr.A. team that Benoît and their father both played with.

The day after Pouliot scored his first-ever OHL goal in February 2004, his father died from leukemia.

Career statistics

Regular season and playoffs

International

Awards and honours

References

External links

1986 births
Boston Bruins players
Buffalo Sabres players
Canadian ice hockey left wingers
Edmonton Oilers players
Franco-Ontarian people
Ice hockey people from Ontario
Living people
Minnesota Wild draft picks
Minnesota Wild players
Montreal Canadiens players
National Hockey League first-round draft picks
New York Rangers players
People from the United Counties of Prescott and Russell
Sudbury Wolves players
Tampa Bay Lightning players